KSNY-FM (101.5 FM, "Big Star") is the companion station to KSNY (AM).  The station began in 1980 at 101.7 MHz as 'FM-102' with an easy listening format.  The station was automated in the beginning until its move to 101.5 and the format change to country.  The station now has coverage in the Big Spring and Abilene markets. In 2001, KSNY began a sister station, 98.9 KLYD "Real Rock." but it was automated until 2003.

Trivia
The station's studios moved from KSNY drive, west of town on Ave. R, to the old Texas Utilities building next to the "SCAT" TV Cable building around 2002.

The station signed on the air on September 2, 1980, with an easy listening format. In 1984, the station upgraded its format to adult contemporary for the next seven years until flipping to classic rock in 1991. It was initially a 3,000-watt class A on 101.7, transmitting from the AM tower at the former studios. The station upgraded its class to C2 in the 1990s and C1 on 101.5 in the early 2000s.

The station added a sister station for rock listeners, KLYD 98.9, in 2001, but it was fully automated until 2003.

The DJs for the station become, in effect, local celebrities, with the recent stand-outs being Sheree Stone, Magic Johnson, Cody 
Christopher, Bruce Bell, Shotgun Kellie Taylor, Becca Grey, "Suzie Q." Leslie Summers, Colby James, Brooks Moon, Gracie James, Blue Patrick, and James Mac.

External links

Country radio stations in the United States
SNY-FM